Kardi Gras, Vol. 1: The Clash is the fifth studio album by Canadian rapper Kardinal Offishall, released October 30, 2015 on his independent label Black Stone Colleagues Inc. and Universal Music Canada. It is his first studio album in seven years. The first single, "That Chick Right There" (featuring Chaisson), peaked at #68 on the Canadian Hot 100.

Track listing

References 

2015 albums
Albums produced by Kardinal Offishall
Kardinal Offishall albums
Universal Music Canada albums